Here is a complete list of songs by the South Korean girl group (G)I-dle.

0-9

A

B

C

D

E

F

G

H

I

L

M

N

O

P

R

S

T

U

V

W

Other songs

Notes

References

 
G